This is a list of notable Ethiopian Americans, including both immigrants from Ethiopia who obtained American nationality and their American descendants. 

To be included in this list, the person must have a Wikipedia article showing that they are Ethiopian American or must have independent references showing that they are Ethiopian American and are notable.

List
 Abdul "Duke" Fakir - singer
 Abdus Ibrahim - soccer player
 Aminé - rapper/singer/songwriter
 Amsale Aberra - fashion designer
 Aster Aweke - singer
 Carla Harvey - musician
Daniel Yohannes - former U.S. Ambassador to the OECD
 Dereje Agonafer - professor of Mechanical Engineering, National Academy of Engineering Fellow
 Dinaw Mengestu - author
 Electron Kebebew - Chief Surgeon, Stanford University - Department of Surgery
Felonious Munk - comedian/actor/writer
 Fershgenet Melaku - model & rapper
 Gabriel Teodros - hip hop artist
 Gebisa Ejeta - geneticist and recipient of the 2009 World Food Prize
 Gigi - singer
 Girmay Zahilay - politician
 Gonjasufi - musician
 Honey Mahogany - activist, politician, drag performer, and singer.
 Ilfenesh Hadera - actress
 Imani - rapper
 Jelani Nelson - Professor of Electrical Engineering and Computer Science
 Jordan Dangerfield - NFL safety for the Pittsburgh Steelers
 Julie Mehretu - painter
 Kelela - singer-songwriter
 Kenna Zemedkun - rock singer
 Liya Kebede - international supermodel
 Mazi Melesa Pilip - Ethiopian-born American politician
 Mulatu Astatke - musician and arranger, father of Ethio-Jazz
 Nnegest Likké - film director/screenwriter
 Robel Teklemariam - cross country skier
 Selamawi Asgedom - author
 Sossina M. Haile - scientist, professor
 Teshome Gabriel - cinema scholar and professor
 Walidah Imarisha - writer/activist/educator and spoken word artist
 Wayna - singer
 Y-Love - rapper
 Yohannes Sahle - soccer manager

See also
Ethiopian Americans
Ethiopians in Washington, D.C.
List of Ethiopians

Notes

 
Ethiopian American
Ethiopian Americans
Ethiopian
American